Exonomasis is a genus of moths belonging to the family Tineidae. It contains only one species, Exonomasis exolescens, which is found in South Africa.

References

Endemic moths of South Africa
Myrmecozelinae
Monotypic moth genera
Moths of Africa
Lepidoptera of South Africa